Rokitno  is a village in the administrative district of Gmina Błonie, within Warsaw West County, Masovian Voivodeship, in east-central Poland. The village has a population of 130.

References

Rokitno